Good Environmental Status is a qualitative description of the state of the seas that the European Union's Marine Strategy Framework Directive requires its Member States to achieve or maintain by the year 2020. 
Good Environmental Status is described by 11 Descriptors:
Descriptor 1. Biodiversity is maintained 
Descriptor 2. Non-indigenous species do not adversely alter the ecosystem 
Descriptor 3. The population of commercial fish species is healthy 
Descriptor 4. Elements of food webs ensure long-term abundance and reproduction 
Descriptor 5. Eutrophication is minimised 
Descriptor 6. The sea floor integrity ensures functioning of the ecosystem 
Descriptor 7. Permanent alteration of hydrographical conditions does not adversely affect the ecosystem 
Descriptor 8. Concentrations of contaminants give no effects 
Descriptor 9. Contaminants in seafood are below safe levels 
Descriptor 10. Marine litter does not cause harm 
Descriptor 11. Introduction of energy (including underwater noise) does not adversely affect the ecosystem

References

European Union directives
Marine conservation
Environmental law in the European Union